The first election in the Federation of Malaya was for the Municipal Council of George Town in Penang held on 1 December 1951.

Municipal election

George Town

Malacca

References

1951
1951 elections in Malaya
1951 elections in Asia